Khullam Khulla Pyaar Karen is an Indian Hindi-language comedy film starring Govinda and Preity Zinta. Due to complications the film kept on getting delayed therefore it was released only in 2005 despite being ready in 2002. The film was Harmesh Malhotra's last film before his death and was a box office failure.

Synopsis 

Damani (Prem Chopra) and Goverdhan (Kader Khan) are bitter enemies but when they get word from their boss Trikal Annaa (Sadashiv Amrapurkar) to stop the rivalry, they are forced to shake hands. They soon decide to get their children married to each other. Goverdhan tells his son Vicky (Mohnish Behl) to go to Surat to meet Damani's daughter Priti (Preity Zinta).

Whilst going to Surat, Vicky offers a lift to Raja (Govinda) but the car has an accident and falls into the river. Some people manage to rescue Raja but not Vicky. Using this as an advantage and knowing about Vicky's purpose, he poses himself as Vicky and makes his way to Surat. He meets Priti and falls in love with her. At first when Priti meets Raja (under the guise of Vicky), she hates him but soon she falls in love with him. Goverdhan soon gets word that Vicky has met Priti and both have agreed to marry.

Then to his shock, the real Vicky comes home and announces that he never made it to Surat and he did not meet Priti. Goverdhan makes his way to Surat to find out who is there posing as his son...

Cast 
 Govinda ... Raja Khanna
 Preity Zinta ... Priti
 Satish Kaushik ... Sindhi 
 Sadashiv Amrapurkar ... Supremo/Trikal Anna
 Prem Chopra ... Damani
 Kader Khan ... Goverdhan
 Mohnish Behl ... Vicky
 Himani Shivpuri ... Goverdhan's wife
 Johnny Lever ... Gangster Pasha Bhai
 Asrani ... Pandit
 Razak Khan ... Goverdhan's Brother in law
Veeru Krishnan ... Sindhi's customer

Soundtrack
Music composed by Anand-Milind.

References

External links 
 

2000s Hindi-language films
2005 films
Films scored by Anand–Milind
Films directed by Harmesh Malhotra